The New York–New Jersey League was a class D level minor league baseball league that played in the 1913 season. With the New York State League and International League among others occupying the territory, the 6–team league had no large cities involved. The next year the circuit was renamed the Atlantic League.

Cities represented
 Danbury, CT: Danbury Hatters 1913
 Kingston, NY: Kingston Colonials 1913
 Long Branch, NJ: Long Branch Cubans 1913
 Middletown, NY: Middletown Middies 1913
 Newburgh, NY: Newburgh Dutchmen 1913
 Poughkeepsie, NY: Poughkeepsie Honey Bugs 1913

Standings and statistics

1913 New York–New Jersey League 

Playoffs: None

Sources
 The Encyclopedia of Minor League Baseball: Second Edition.

Baseball leagues in New York (state)
Defunct baseball leagues in the United States
Baseball leagues in New Jersey
Sports leagues established in 1913
1913 establishments in the United States
Defunct minor baseball leagues in the United States
Sports leagues disestablished in 1913
1913 disestablishments in the United States